Inga pyrrhoxantha is a moth in the family Oecophoridae. It was described by Edward Meyrick in 1931. It is found in French Guiana.

References

Moths described in 1931
Inga (moth)